Hadelin de La Tour du Pin Chambly de La Charce (born August 26, 1951) is a French diplomat. He served as the Ambassador of France to Monaco.

Early life
De La Tour graduated from Sciences Po and the École nationale d'administration in 1977.

Career
De La Tour joined the French foreign service in 1977. He served as the Ambassador of France to Guinea from 1994 to 1997, and the Ambassador of France to Zimbabwe from 1997 to 2000. He served as the Ambassador of France to Cyprus from 2003 to 2006, and the Ambassador of France to Venezuela from 2006 to 2009. He served as the Ambassador of France to the Pacific Region from 2009 to 2014. He succeeded Hughes Moret as the Ambassador of France to Monaco in 2014.

De La Tour is a Knight of the Legion of Honour and the National Order of Merit.

References

1951 births
Living people
Sciences Po alumni
École nationale d'administration alumni
21st-century French diplomats
Ambassadors of France to Monaco
Ambassadors of France to Venezuela
Chevaliers of the Légion d'honneur
Knights of the Ordre national du Mérite